New Long Leg is the debut studio album by English post-punk band Dry Cleaning, released in April 2021 on the label 4AD. Produced by John Parish, it received critical acclaim by the press in the UK and the US.

Background
In early March 2020, the band were immersed in their first American shows, having played in New York City, which Dowse described as “almost like a religious experience.” After that show, the pandemic started and they had to abandon the rest of their tour and go back to London. By that time, they had most of the album written, and later that year went into the studio with producer John Parish.

Composition

Influences and style
The inspiration for this album comes from artists such as Augustus Pablo, Black Sabbath and Led Zeppelin. The music has been described as "a modern retelling of Siouxsie and the Banshees and the Smiths" with a "spoken-word stream-of-consciousness".

Lyrics
Most of the lyrics on the album come from vocalist Florence Shaw’s writing exercises: “Sometimes you just can’t be fucked with a lot of topics,” she said. “You’re like, ‘The only thing I care about right now is baked beans.’ Or, ‘The only thing I care about is Star Trek: The Next Generation. That is my interest, and everything else can fuck off.’ And I’ll write whatever I can think of about that, and all my feelings about it. Sometimes it’ll go off into another subject. It’s just a way to make me go.”

Songs
The album’s lead single “Scratchcard Lanyard,” was described as a revenge fantasy. “It’s feeling quite pissed-off and fatigued with the roles you’re asked to fulfill as a woman past the age of 30,” said Shaw. “The pressure to have children is this sudden thing that descends, like, ‘You’re a carer now.’ Not that I resent any of those things in principle. Mothers are the greatest people in the world. But it was a noticeable thing, that suddenly I have these pressures that my brother and my male friends don’t have.”

“Unsmart Lady” was noted by Rolling Stone as  having a “basement-rattling stoner-rock groove” and ”lyrics about body image“. “‘Fat, podgy, no makeup’ — I was thinking about these things that are supposed to be a source of shame about your appearance, and wanting to use them in a powerful way,” Shaw said. “Just trying to survive when you feel knackered and put-upon and shit about yourself, but you say, ‘I don’t care, I’m great.'”

Critical reception 

New Long Leg was critically acclaimed upon release. On review aggregator website, Metacritic, New Long Leg has an average rating of 86 out of 100, indicating "universal acclaim based on 15 critic reviews". On aggregator site, AnyDecentMusic?, New Long Leg has an average rating of 8.1 out of 10, based on 17 critic scores.

Writing for The Line of Best Fit, Ross Horton praised the album's unique, artful sound in contrast to many of the genre's contemporary artists: "In the past decade or so, countless bands have been brought up from the same well of tightly-wound, expressionistic rock (Protomartyr, Preoccupations, Shame, IDLES, Fontaines D.C.), but none hold the same uniquely fascinating appeal that Dry Cleaning have."

Horton also said of New Long Leg, "Dry Cleaning's enigmatic, iconoclastic vocalist is unlike any other, her presence completely transforming the experience of listening to the band. She doesn’t shout, or even really emote, but just conveys the words how they’re supposed to be heard, over some excellently played, saturnine rock." Writing in The New York Times, Lindsay Zoladz called the album "excellent," noting that, "Shaw is equal parts frontwoman and spoken-word poet, weaving the random linguistic detritus of modern life into loose, surreal narratives."

In July 2021, the song "Strong Feelings" was used for the Fall-Winter Haute Couture Chanel show in Paris at Palais Galliera.

On 16 November 2021, New Long Leg was named "Album of the Year" by Rough Trade. On 3 December, Resident Music also named it "Album of the Year".

Accolades

Track listing

Personnel
Sourced from AllMusic.

Dry Cleaning
 Florence Shaw - vocals, melodica
 Tom Dowse - guitar, keyboards, piano, synthesizer, percussion
 Lewis Maynard - bass
 Nick Baxton - drums, percussion, programming, keyboards, synthesizer

Charts

References

External links 
 

2021 debut albums
Dry Cleaning (band) albums
4AD albums
Albums produced by John Parish